Harold Lucius Bishop Jr. (born April 8, 1970) is a former American football tight end in the National Football League (NFL) for five teams.

He played college football at Louisiana State University from 1989 to 1994. He was drafted by the Tampa Bay Buccaneers in 1994. In the 1995 off season the Buccaneers traded Bishop to the Cleveland Browns for the 35th pick in the second round of the 1996 NFL Draft and selected Mike Alstott with the pick. He was on the team when the Browns became the Baltimore Ravens. He played one season in NFL Europe with the Rhein Fire, who won the World Bowl in 1998. Bishop then signed with the Pittsburgh Steelers and played with them from 1998 to 1999.

References

1970 births
Living people
People from Booneville, Mississippi
American football tight ends
LSU Tigers football players
Tampa Bay Buccaneers players
Cleveland Browns players
Washington Redskins players
Baltimore Ravens players
Pittsburgh Steelers players
Players of American football from Mississippi